Narcissus yellow stripe potyvirus (NYSV) is a plant pathogenic Potyvirus of the family Potyviridae which infects plants of the genus Narcissus. It is one of the commoner viruses infecting Narcissus, and is transmitted by aphids.

Infection with NYSV produces light or grayish green, or yellow stripes or mottles on the upper two-thirds of the leaf, which may be roughened or twisted. The flowers which may be smaller than usual may also be streaked or blotched.

Taxonomy 
Added to the ICTV taxonomy in the 5th report (1991), and the family Potyviridae in 1993.

References

Bibliography 

Viral plant pathogens and diseases
Potyviruses